Abby Martin is an American journalist and presenter of The Empire Files.

Abby Martin or Abigail Martin  may also refer to:

Abby Martin, character in literary output of American writer Sarah Orne Jewett
Abigail Martin, American author and academic married to author Jerry L. Martin

See also
Abbé Martin (disambiguation) 
Abe Martin (disambiguation)